Congregation Ezra Bessaroth (EB) is a Sephardic congregation with a synagogue in the Seward Park neighborhood of Seattle, Washington.

Ezra Bessaroth is one of Seattle's two Sephardic congregations, the other being Sephardic Bikur Holim Congregation.  Ezra Bessaroth maintains the liturgy and customs of the Mediterranean Island of Rhodes.

Rabbis

Rabbi Ron-Ami Meyers has been Rabbi of Ezra Bessaroth from August 2011 to July 2018.

Cantors

Yogev Nuna was chazan (cantor) of Ezra Bessaroth for several years .

Isaac Azose was chazan of Ezra Bessaroth from March 1966 to the end of 1999.
He has published several prayer books for the needs of the Sephardic Jewish communities.

References

External links
 Congregation Ezra Bessaroth, official website
 The Web Home of Hazzan Isaac Azose

Greek-Jewish culture in the United States
Jews and Judaism in Seattle
Turkish-Jewish culture in the United States
Religious buildings and structures in Seattle
Sephardi Jewish culture in the United States
Orthodox synagogues in Washington (state)